Plum Run (Rock Run in 1821) is a Pennsylvania stream flowing southward from the Gettysburg Battlefield between the Gettys-Black Divide on the east and on the west, the drainage divide for Pitzer Run, Biesecker Run, Willoughby Run, and Marsh Creek.  The Plum Run Valley was the location of Battle of Gettysburg, Second Day, and Third Day military engagements, as well as the postbellum Crawford's Glen and Tipton Park.   In 1972, the Slaughter Pen comfort station was temporarily closed after Youth Conservation Corps participants of Camp Eisenhower discovered fecal pollution in Plum Run.

See also
List of rivers of Pennsylvania

References

Gettysburg Battlefield
Rivers of Adams County, Pennsylvania
Rivers of Pennsylvania
Tributaries of the Monocacy River